Thomas à Kempis (c. 1380 – 25 July 1471;) was a German-Dutch canon regular of the late medieval period and the author of The Imitation of Christ, published anonymously in Latin in the Netherlands c. 1418–1427, one of the most popular and best known Christian devotional books. His name means "Thomas of Kempen", Kempen being his home town.

He was a member of the Modern Devotion, a spiritual movement during the late medieval period, and a follower of Geert Groote and Florens Radewyns, the founders of the Brethren of the Common Life.

Life
Thomas was born in Kempen in the Rhineland. His surname at birth was Hemerken (or Hammerlein), meaning the family's profession, "little hammer," Latinized into "Malleolus." His father, Johann, was a blacksmith and his mother, Gertrud, was a schoolmistress. Although almost universally known in English as Thomas à Kempis, the "a" represents the Latin "from" and is erroneously accented. In his writings he signed himself "Thomas Kempensis" or "Thomas Kempis".

In 1392, Thomas followed his brother, Johann, to Deventer in the Netherlands in order to attend the noted Latin school there. While attending this school, Thomas encountered the Brethren of the Common Life, followers of Gerard Groote's Modern Devotion. He attended school in Deventer from 1392 to 1399.

After leaving school, Thomas went to the nearby city of Zwolle to visit his brother again, after Johann had become the prior of the Monastery of Mount St. Agnes there. This community was one of the Canons Regular of the Congregation of Windesheim, founded by disciples of Groote in order to provide a way of life more in keeping with the norms of monastic life of the period. Thomas himself entered Mount St. Agnes in 1406. He was not ordained a priest, however, until almost a decade later. He became a prolific copyist and writer. Thomas received Holy Orders in 1413 and was made sub-prior of the monastery in 1429.

His first tenure of office as subprior was interrupted by the exile of the community from Agnetenberg (1429).  A dispute had arisen in connection with an appointment to the vacant See of Utrecht. Pope Martin V rejected the nomination of Bishop-elect Rudolf van Diepholt, and imposed an interdict. The Canons remained in exile in observance of the interdict until the question was settled (1432). During this time, Thomas was sent to Arnhem to care for his ailing brother. He remained there until his brother died in November, 1432.

Otherwise, Thomas spent his time between devotional exercises in writing and in copying manuscripts. He copied the Bible no fewer than four times, one of the copies being preserved at Darmstadt, Germany, in five volumes. In its teachings he was widely read and his works abound with biblical quotations, especially from the New Testament.

As subprior he was charged with instructing novices, and in that capacity wrote four booklets between 1418 and 1427, later collected and named after the title of the first chapter of the first booklet: The Imitation of Christ. Thomas More said it was one of the three books everybody ought to own. Thirteen translations of the Imitatio Christi and three paraphrases in English seem to have been published between 1500 and 1700. Thomas died near Zwolle in 1471. There is a legend that he was denied canonization some 200 years after his death by the Catholic Church due to the presence of scratch marks on the interior of his coffin lid, which supposedly disqualifies him from sainthood as it would mean he did not peacefully embrace death. However, there is scant evidence to support that he was buried alive or the idea that the Church would have denied him sainthood if they did discover he died in this manner.

Works

Kempis's 1441 autograph manuscript of The Imitation of Christ is available in the Bibliothèque Royale in Brussels (shelfmark: MS 5455-61).

He also wrote the biographies of New Devotion members—Gerard Groote, Floris Radewijns, Jan van de Gronde, and Jan Brinckerinck. His important works include a series of sermons to the novices of St. Augustine Monastery, including Prayers and Meditations on the Life of Christ, Meditations on the Incarnation of Christ, Of True Compunction of Heart, Soliloquy of the Soul, Garden of Roses, Valley of Lilies, and a Life of St. Lidwina of Schiedam.

Quotations
The following quotes are attributed to him:

"Without the Way, there is no going,
Without the Truth, there is no knowing,
Without the Life, there is no living."

"If thou wilt receive profit, read with humility, simplicity, and faith, and seek not at any time the fame of being learned."
"At the Day of Judgement we shall not be asked what we have read, but what we have done." — The Imitation of Christ, Book I, ch. 3

"For man proposes, but God disposes" — The Imitation of Christ, Book I, ch. 19

"If, however, you seek Jesus in all things, you will surely find Him. " — The Imitation of Christ, Book II, ch. 7

”O quam cito transit gloria mundi [Oh how quickly the glory of the world passes away]” — The Imitation of Christ, suggested as the origin of the phrase “Sic transit gloria mundi”

"In angello cum libello" (with slight variations), "In a little corner with a little book"
— Shortened form of a motto often ascribed to, or associated with, Thomas a Kempis. The complete saying as reported by an early biographer is a mixture of Latin and Dutch and runs as follows: "In omnibus requiem quaesivi, sed non inveni, nisi in hoexkens ende boexkens", "I have sought everywhere for peace, but I have found it not, save in nooks and in books."

Veneration
A monument was dedicated to his memory in the presence of the archbishop of Utrecht in St. Michael's Church, Zwolle, on November 11, 1897. In 1964, this church closed, causing his shrine to be moved to a new St. Michael's Church outside the centre of Zwolle. In 2005, this church also closed and his shrine was moved to the Onze-Lieve-Vrouw-ten-Hemelopneming kerk (Assumption of Mary church) in the centre of Zwolle.

References

Notes

Citations

Sources 

This article incorporates Public Domain material from the New Schaff-Herzog Encyclopedia of Religious Knowledge, Vol. VI: Innocents — Liudger, Schaff, Philip.

External links

 
 
 
 
 
Read Imitation of Christ online
 Quotes from Thomas à Kempis
 Devotio Moderna
 Thomas à Kempis College, Zwolle, Netherlands; at Wikipedia (NL)

 

1380 births
1471 deaths
15th-century biographers
15th-century Christian mystics
15th-century Dutch Roman Catholic priests
15th-century German Roman Catholic priests
15th-century Latin writers
Augustinian canons
Burials in Overijssel
Christian hagiographers
Devotio Moderna
Dutch biographers
Dutch male writers
German biographers
German expatriates in the Netherlands
German male non-fiction writers
Male biographers
Medieval Christian devotional writers
Medieval European scribes
People from the Electorate of Cologne
People from Zwolle
Pre-Reformation Anglican saints
Roman Catholic mystics